The International Secretariat of Stone Masons, also known as the International Secretariat of Stone Workers, was a global union federation bringing together trade unions representing stone masons, quarry workers and paviours.

The unions of stone masons in Austria, Germany, Norway, and Sweden, began working together in 1898.  In 1903, they decided to form an international federation, which was launched at a conference in Zurich, where its headquarters were also located.  In 1923, the small International Secretariat of Stone Setters joined the stone masons, and by 1925 the federation had 14 affiliates, with a total of 108,455 members, growing to 127,500 by 1935.

Throughout the federation's existence, it was led by secretary Robert Kolb.  He retired on 1 January 1947, when the federation merged into the International Federation of Building and Wood Workers.

Affiliates
As of 1922, the following unions were affiliated:

References

Stonemasons' trade unions
Trade unions established in 1903
Trade unions disestablished in 1947
International Federation of Building and Wood Workers
Global union federations